North Thoresby is a heritage railway station in North Thoresby, Lincolnshire. The station, which was previously part of the East Lincolnshire Railway, closed in 1970, but has since been reopened by the Lincolnshire Wolds Railway. The LWR aims to extend the line further in both directions, northwards as far as Holton-Le-Clay and southwards to Louth.

History
The station was opened on 1 March 1848 to serve the Lincolnshire village of North Thoresby. The architects of the station buildings were John Grey Weightman and Matthew Ellison Hadfield of Sheffield.

The station was provided with staggered platforms either side of a level crossing; the up platform to the south of the crossing and the down to the north.

A signal box which contained 25 levers was situated on the north side of the level crossing and controlled the crossing gates as well as access to the small goods yard with a siding on each side of the line. The siding on the down side ran into a loading dock behind the down platform. Unlike Ludborough, the station had no goods shed. The goods yard closed on 30 December 1963, but the station remained open to passengers until 5 October 1970. In 1956–57, around a dozen passenger trains bound for Grimsby called at the station on weekdays, with the first two being local workings from Louth, save for a Mondays only service which called only to set down passengers. North Thoresby was the only intermediate station between Grimsby and Louth to remain open until October 1970.After 1970 the down line was removed and only the up line through the station remained. The line finally closed in December 1980.

Preservation and reopening

Tracklaying by the Lincolnshire Wolds Railway reached North Thoresby in 2008 and the first train for 47 years between the two stations ran on 26 August 2009. The south (up) platform has been restored and a waiting shelter erected. The level crossing to the north has been tarmaced over, but the north crossing gate has survived. The stationmaster's house remains in private occupation.

The LWR plans to extend the line northwards beyond North Thoresby to as far as Holton-Le-Clay, which will involve reinstating the adjacent level crossing at the station.

References

Sources

External links
 North Thoresby on navigable O. S. map
 Image of North Thoresby in the last week of operation

Heritage railway stations in Lincolnshire
Railway stations in Great Britain closed in 1970
Railway stations in Great Britain opened in 1848
Former Great Northern Railway stations
Beeching closures in England
John Grey Weightman railway stations
Matthew Ellison Hadfield railway stations